The women's freestyle 68 kilograms is a competition featured at the 2021 World Wrestling Championships, and was held in Oslo, Norway on 6 and 7 October.

This freestyle wrestling competition consists of a single-elimination tournament, with a repechage used to determine the winner of two bronze medals. The two finalists face off for gold and silver medals. Each wrestler who loses to one of the two finalists moves into the repechage, culminating in a pair of bronze medal matches featuring the semifinal losers each facing the remaining repechage opponent from their half of the bracket.

Each bout consists of a single round within a six-minute limit including two halves of three minutes. The wrestler who scores more points is the winner.

Meerim Zhumanazarova from Kyrgyzstan won the gold medal after pinning Rin Miyaji of Japan in the final, Zhumanazarova scored four points before beating her opponent by fall in the 3rd minute of the final. World and Olympic Champion Tamyra Mensah-Stock won the bronze medal after a surprise defeat by fall in the semifinal, the other bronze medal went to Khanum Velieva from the Russian Wrestling Federation.

Results
Legend
F — Won by fall

Main bracket

Repechage

Final standing

References

External links
Official website

Women's freestyle 68 kg
2021 in women's sport wrestling